The 2018–19 season was Notts County's 156th season in their history and their fourth consecutive season in League Two. The club also competed in the FA Cup, EFL Cup and EFL Trophy. The season covers the period from 1 July 2018 to 30 June 2019.

Competitions

Pre-season friendlies
County confirmed friendlies against Basford United, Derby County, Leicester City and Luton Town.

League Two

League table

Results summary

Results by matchday

Matches
On 21 June 2018, the League Two fixtures for the forthcoming season were announced.

FA Cup

The first round draw was made live on BBC by Dennis Wise and Dion Dublin on 22 October.

EFL Cup

On 15 June 2018, the draw for the first round was made in Vietnam.

EFL Trophy

On 13 July 2018, the initial group stage draw bar the U21 invited clubs was announced. The draw for the second round was made live on Talksport by Leon Britton and Steve Claridge on 16 November.

First-Team squad

Statistics

|}

Goals scored

Disciplinary Record

Transfers

Transfers in

Transfers out

Loans in

Loans out

References

Notts County
Notts County F.C. seasons